Billy Beer is a brand of beer first made in the United States in July 1977, by the Falls City Brewing Company. It was promoted by Billy Carter, whose older brother Jimmy was then the President of the United States. In October 1978, Falls City announced that it was closing after less than a year of Carter's promotion. The beer was produced by Cold Spring Brewing, West End Brewing, and Pearl Brewing Company. In 2018 Uptown Brewing Company and Billy Beer, Inc. entered into a partnership with Greene County, North Carolina to build a 10,000 sq. foot production facility at the North West Greene Industrial Park.

Endorsement printed on beer cans
Written on each can were these words of endorsement, which were followed by Billy Carter's signature:
Brewed expressly for and with the personal approval of one of AMERICA's all-time Great Beer Drinkers—Billy Carter.
I had this beer brewed up just for me.  I think it's the best I ever tasted.  And I've tasted a lot.  I think you'll like it, too.

Despite Carter's promotion of Billy Beer, "in private he drank Pabst".

As a collectible

After Billy Beer ceased production in 1978, advertisements appeared in newspapers offering to sell Billy Beer cans for several hundred to several thousands of dollars each, attempting to profit from their perceived rarity. However, since the cans were actually produced in the millions, the real value of a can ranged from 50 cents to one dollar in 1981.

In popular media
In the 22nd episode of season 3 of The Simpsons, "The Otto Show", Homer Simpson pulls a can of Billy Beer from the pocket of his "concert-going jacket", presumably from the last concert he had attended when he was younger, and drinks the beer.

In the 8th episode of season 9 of The Simpsons, "Lisa the Skeptic", Homer is hoarding Billy Beer cans, anticipating that they will rise in value. He drinks one of the beers and says wistfully, "We elected the wrong Carter".

In the opening of Daffy Duck's Quackbusters, Daffy Duck works as a DeLorean salesman, and offers "a free gift pack of ice-cold Billy Beer with each and every purchase."

In the episode Shoeway to Heaven of season 9 of Married With Children, Al is dumbfounded and asks the reporter "well what happened in the seventies?" to which the reporter replies "the Ford Pinto, Diff'rent Strokes and Billy Beer".

10+ songs were released about Billy Beer in the 1970s and early 80s.

References

Products introduced in 1977
American beer brands
Carter family
Products and services discontinued in 1978